Rajakumar Vijaya Raghunatha Thondaiman is an Indian politician and former member of the Legislative Assembly of Tamil Nadu. He is a member of the Pudukkottai Royal Family, youngest brother of the Maharajah of Pudukkottai state. He was elected to the Tamil Nadu legislative assembly as an Indian National Congress candidate from Pudukkottai constituency in 1967, 1971, 1977 elections and as an Indian National Congress (Indira) candidate in 1980 election.

References 

Indian National Congress politicians from Tamil Nadu
Living people
Year of birth missing (living people)
Tamil Nadu MLAs 1967–1972
Tamil Nadu MLAs 1977–1980
Tamil Nadu MLAs 1980–1984